ATM serine/threonine kinase or Ataxia-telangiectasia mutated, symbol ATM, is a serine/threonine protein kinase that is recruited and activated by DNA double-strand breaks. It phosphorylates several key proteins that initiate activation of the DNA damage checkpoint, leading to cell cycle arrest, DNA repair or apoptosis. Several of these targets, including p53, CHK2, BRCA1, NBS1 and H2AX are tumor suppressors.

In 1995, the gene was discovered by Yosef Shiloh who named its product ATM since he found that its mutations are responsible for the disorder ataxia–telangiectasia. In 1998, the Shiloh and Kastan laboratories independently showed that ATM is a protein kinase whose activity is enhanced by DNA damage.

Introduction 
Throughout the cell cycle DNA is monitored for damage. Damages result from errors during replication, by-products of metabolism, general toxic drugs or ionizing radiation. The cell cycle has different DNA damage checkpoints, which inhibit the next or maintain the current cell cycle step. There are two main checkpoints, the G1/S and the G2/M, during the cell cycle, which preserve correct progression. ATM plays a role in cell cycle delay after DNA damage, especially after double-strand breaks (DSBs). ATM is recruited to sites of double strand breaks by DSB sensor proteins, such as the MRN complex. After being recruited, it phosphorylates NBS1, along other DSB repair proteins. These modified mediator proteins then amplify the DNA damage signal, and transduce the signals to downstream effectors such as CHK2 and p53.

Structure 
The ATM gene codes for a 350 kDa protein consisting of 3056 amino acids. ATM belongs to the superfamily of phosphatidylinositol 3-kinase-related kinases (PIKKs). The PIKK superfamily comprises six Ser/Thr-protein kinases that show a sequence similarity to phosphatidylinositol 3-kinases (PI3Ks). This protein kinase family includes ATR (ATM- and RAD3-related), DNA-PKcs (DNA-dependent protein kinase catalytic subunit) and mTOR (mammalian target of rapamycin). Characteristic for ATM are five domains. These are from N-terminus to C-terminus the HEAT repeat domain, the FRAP-ATM-TRRAP (FAT) domain, the kinase domain (KD), the PIKK-regulatory domain (PRD) and the FAT-C-terminal (FATC) domain. The HEAT repeats directly bind to the C-terminus of NBS1. The FAT domain interacts with ATM's kinase domain to stabilize the C-terminus region of ATM itself. The KD domain resumes kinase activity, while the PRD and the FATC domain regulate it. Although no structure for ATM has been solved, the overall shape of ATM is very similar to DNA-PKcs and is composed of a head and a long arm that is thought to wrap around double-stranded DNA after a conformational change. The entire N-terminal domain together with the FAT domain are predicted to adopt an α-helical structure, which was found by sequence analysis. This α-helical structure is believed to form a tertiary structure, which has a curved, tubular shape present for example in the Huntingtin protein, which also contains HEAT repeats. FATC is the C-terminal domain with a length of about 30 amino acids. It is highly conserved and consists of an α-helix followed by a sharp turn, which is stabilized by a disulfide bond.

Function 
A complex of the three proteins MRE11, RAD50 and NBS1 (XRS2 in yeast), called the MRN complex in humans, recruits ATM to double strand breaks (DSBs) and holds the two ends together. ATM directly interacts with the NBS1 subunit and phosphorylates the histone variant H2AX on Ser139. This phosphorylation generates binding sites for adaptor proteins with a BRCT domain. These adaptor proteins then recruit different factors including the effector protein kinase CHK2 and the tumor suppressor p53. The ATM-mediated DNA damage response consists of a rapid and a delayed response. The effector kinase CHK2 is phosphorylated and thereby activated by ATM. Activated CHK2 phosphorylates phosphatase CDC25A, which is degraded thereupon and can no longer dephosphorylate CDK1-cyclin B, resulting in cell-cycle arrest. If the DSB can not be repaired during this rapid response, ATM additionally phosphorylates MDM2 and p53 at Ser15. p53 is also phosphorylated by the effector kinase CHK2. These phosphorylation events lead to stabilization and activation of p53 and subsequent transcription of numerous p53 target genes including CDK inhibitor p21 which lead to long-term cell-cycle arrest or even apoptosis.

The protein kinase ATM may also be involved in mitochondrial homeostasis, as a regulator of mitochondrial autophagy (mitophagy) whereby old, dysfunctional mitochondria are removed. Increased ATM activity also occurs in viral infection where ATM is activated early during dengue virus infection as part of autophagy induction and ER stress response.

Regulation 
A functional MRN complex is required for ATM activation after DSBs. The complex functions upstream of ATM in mammalian cells and induces conformational changes that facilitate an increase in the affinity of ATM towards its substrates, such as CHK2 and p53.
Inactive ATM is present in the cells without DSBs as dimers or multimers. Upon DNA damage, ATM autophosphorylates on residue Ser1981. This phosphorylation provokes dissociation of ATM dimers, which is followed by the release of active ATM monomers. Further autophosphorylation (of residues Ser367 and Ser1893) is required for normal activity of the ATM kinase. Activation of ATM by the MRN complex is preceded by at least two steps, i.e. recruitment of ATM to DSB ends by the mediator of DNA damage checkpoint protein 1 (MDC1) which binds to MRE11, and the subsequent stimulation of kinase activity with the NBS1 C-terminus.
The three domains FAT, PRD and FATC are all involved in regulating the activity of the KD kinase domain. The FAT domain interacts with ATM's KD domain to stabilize the C-terminus region of ATM itself. The FATC domain is critical for kinase activity and highly sensitive to mutagenesis. It mediates protein-protein interaction for example with the histone acetyltransferase TIP60 (HIV-1 Tat interacting protein 60 kDa), which acetylates ATM on residue Lys3016. The acetylation occurs in the C-terminal half of the PRD domain and is required for ATM kinase activation and for its conversion into monomers. While deletion of the entire PRD domain abolishes the kinase activity of ATM, specific small deletions show no effect.

Germline mutations and cancer risk

People who carry a heterozygous ATM mutation have increased risk of mainly pancreatic cancer, prostate cancer, stomach cancer and invasive ductal carcinoma of the breast. Homozygous ATM mutation confers the disease ataxia–telangiectasia (AT), a rare human disease characterized by cerebellar degeneration, extreme cellular sensitivity to radiation and a predisposition to cancer. All AT patients contain mutations in the ATM gene. Most other AT-like disorders are defective in genes encoding the MRN protein complex. One feature of the ATM protein is its rapid increase in kinase activity immediately following double-strand break formation. The phenotypic manifestation of AT is due to the broad range of substrates for the ATM kinase, involving DNA repair, apoptosis, G1/S, intra-S checkpoint and G2/M checkpoints, gene regulation, translation initiation, and telomere maintenance. Therefore, a defect in ATM has severe consequences in repairing certain types of damage to DNA, and cancer may result from improper repair.  AT patients have an increased risk for breast cancer that has been ascribed to ATM's interaction and phosphorylation of BRCA1 and its associated proteins following DNA damage.

Somatic ATM mutations in sporadic cancers
Mutations in the ATM gene are found at relatively low frequencies in sporadic cancers. According to COSMIC, the Catalogue Of Somatic Mutations In Cancer, the frequencies with which heterozygous mutations in ATM are found in common cancers include 0.7% in 713 ovarian cancers, 0.9% in central nervous system cancers, 1.9% in 1,120 breast cancers,  2.1% in 847 kidney cancers, 4.6% in colon cancers, 7.2% among 1,040 lung cancers and 11.1% in 1790 hematopoietic and lymphoid tissue cancers. Certain kinds of leukemias and lymphomas, including mantle cell lymphoma, T-ALL, atypical B cell chronic lymphocytic leukemia, and T-PLL are also associated with ATM defects. A comprehensive literature search on ATM deficiency in pancreatic cancer, that captured 5,234 patients, estimated that the total prevalence of germline or somatic ATM mutations in pancreatic cancer was 6.4%. ATM mutations may serve as predictive biomarkers of response for certain therapies, since preclinical studies have found that ATM deficiency can sensitise some cancer types to ATR inhibition.

Frequent epigenetic deficiencies of ATM in cancers
ATM is one of the DNA repair genes frequently hypermethylated in its promoter region in various cancers (see table of such genes in Cancer epigenetics).  The promoter methylation of ATM causes reduced protein or mRNA expression of ATM.

More than 73% of brain tumors were found to be methylated in the ATM gene promoter and there was strong inverse correlation between ATM promoter methylation and its protein expression (p < 0.001).

The ATM gene promoter was observed to be hypermethylated in 53% of small (impalpable) breast cancers and was hypermethylated in 78% of stage II or greater breast cancers with a highly significant correlation (P = 0.0006) between reduced ATM mRNA abundance and aberrant methylation of the ATM gene promoter.

In non-small cell lung cancer (NSCLC), the ATM promoter methylation status of paired tumors and surrounding histologically uninvolved lung tissue was found to be 69% and 59%, respectively.  However, in more advanced NSCLC the frequency of ATM promoter methylation was lower at 22%.  The finding of ATM promoter methylation in surrounding histologically uninvolved lung tissue suggests that ATM deficiency may be present early in a field defect leading to progression to NSCLC.

In squamous cell carcinoma of the head and neck, 42% of tumors displayed ATM promoter methylation.

DNA damage appears to be the primary underlying cause of cancer, and deficiencies in DNA repair likely underlie many forms of cancer.  If DNA repair is deficient, DNA damage tends to accumulate. Such excess DNA damage may increase mutational errors during DNA replication due to error-prone translesion synthesis. Excess DNA damage may also increase epigenetic alterations due to errors during DNA repair. Such mutations and epigenetic alterations may give rise to cancer.  The frequent epigenetic deficiency of ATM in a number of cancers likely contributed to the progression of those cancers.

Meiosis
ATM functions during meiotic prophase.  The wild-type ATM gene is expressed at a four-fold increased level in human testes compared to somatic cells (such as skin fibroblasts).  In both mice and humans, ATM deficiency results in female and male infertility.  Deficient ATM expression causes severe meiotic disruption during prophase I.  In addition, impaired ATM-mediated DNA DSB repair has been identified as a likely cause of aging of mouse and human oocytes.  Expression of the ATM gene, as well as other key DSB repair genes, declines with age in mouse and human oocytes and this decline is paralleled by an increase of DSBs in primordial follicles.  These findings indicate that ATM-mediated homologous recombinational repair is a crucial function of meiosis.

Interactions 
Ataxia telangiectasia mutated has been shown to interact with:

 Abl gene, 
 BRCA1, 
 Bloom syndrome protein, 
 DNA-PKcs, 
 FANCD2, 
 MRE11A, 
 Nibrin, 
 P53, 
 RAD17, 
 RAD51, 
 RBBP8, 
 RHEB,
 RRM2B, 
 SMC1A 
 TERF1,  and
 TP53BP1.

Tefu
The Tefu protein of Drosophila melanogaster is a structural and functional homolog of the human ATM protein.  Tefu, like ATM, is required for DNA repair and normal levels of meiotic recombination in oocytes.

See also 
 Ataxia telangiectasia
 Ataxia telangiectasia and Rad3 related

References

Further reading

External links 
 https://web.archive.org/web/20060107000211/http://www.hprd.org/protein/06347
 Drosophila telomere fusion - The Interactive Fly
  GeneReviews/NCBI/NIH/UW entry on Ataxia telangiectasia
  OMIM entries on Ataxia telangiectasia
 
 

Proteins
EC 2.7.11